Nathaniel Frazier (April 18, 1935 – September 22, 2019) was an American basketball coach. He was head men's coach at Morgan State University, where in 1974 he led the program to the Division II national championship.

Frazier played college basketball for Tuskegee University, where he was twice named to the All-Southern Intercollegiate Athletic Conference team. After several years coaching high school basketball in New York and New Jersey and reviving a master's degree from the City College of New York, Frazier launched his college career as an assistant for Delaware State. He then joined the Illinois staff as an assistant in 1967, at a time when few African-American coaches could be found on Big Ten coaching staffs.

In 1971, Frazier was named head coach at Morgan State. One of his first recruits was seven-footer Marvin Webster, nicknamed “the Human Eraser” due to his shot-blocking prowess. In Webster's junior season of 1973–74, the Bears advanced to the NCAA Division II Final, where they defeated Southwest Missouri State 67–52 to win the school's first national championship. He was named the college division national coach of the year by the Associated Press.

Frazier left the Bears in 1977 to join Willis Reed's coaching staff on the New York Knicks of the National Basketball Association (NBA) for the 1977–78 season. He then went on to serve as president and head coach of the Washington Metros of the short-lived Women's Professional Basketball League (WBL). Frazier returned to college coaching as head coach at Bowie State from 1980 to 1982, and ultimately returned as head coach of Morgan State (now a Division I program) in 1985 and served in that role for four seasons.

Frazier died on September 22, 2019 in Columbia, Maryland at age 84.

References

1935 births
2019 deaths
African-American basketball coaches
African-American basketball players
American men's basketball coaches
American men's basketball players
Basketball coaches from South Carolina
Basketball players from South Carolina
Bowie State Bulldogs men's basketball coaches
City College of New York alumni
College men's basketball head coaches in the United States
Delaware State Hornets men's basketball coaches
High school basketball coaches in New Jersey
High school basketball coaches in New York (state)
Illinois Fighting Illini men's basketball coaches
Morgan State Bears men's basketball coaches
New York Knicks assistant coaches
Sportspeople from Beaufort, South Carolina
Tuskegee Golden Tigers men's basketball players
20th-century African-American sportspeople
21st-century African-American people
Women's Professional Basketball League coaches